Bobomurat Ahmedov (Uzbek Cyrillic: Бобомурат Аҳмедов; born in 1963) is an Uzbek professor of theoretical physics and astrophysics. He is currently chair of the theoretical astrophysics group of the Ulugh Beg Astronomical Institute of the Academy of Sciences of Uzbekistan. His main field of study is the physics and astrophysics of compact objects such as black holes and neutron stars. Moreover, professor Bobomurat Ahmedov's specialties include classical and quantum field theory, special and general relativity, relativistic astrophysics, alternative theories of gravity. Along with his colleagues he has published over 200 scientific papers. He has supervised several PhD students. 
In November 2018 Ahmedov was elected as Fellow of The World Academy of Sciences (TWAS) in Trieste. In December 2020 Ahmedov was elected as Fellow of Islamic World Academy of Sciences (FIAS).

Education
Bobomurat Ahmedov completed his undergraduate and graduate degrees in physics at the Samarkand State University in 1985. Then he studied his post-graduate degree at Institute of Nuclear Physics of Academy of Sciences of Uzbekistan and received his PhD in 1993. 
He has got the highest Doctor of Sciences DSc habilitation degree in physics and mathematics, 2001, from the National University of Uzbekistan (NUUz), Tashkent.

References

Uzbekistani physicists
1963 births
Living people
Fellows of the Islamic World Academy of Sciences